Palanan, officially the Municipality of Palanan (Ibanag: Ili nat Palanan;), is a 1st class municipality in the province of Isabela, Philippines. According to the 2020 census, it has a population of 17,684 people.

It was in Palanan that one of the final chapters of the Philippine–American War was written on March 23, 1901, when General Emilio Aguinaldo was captured by American forces led by General Frederick Funston, who had gained access to Aguinaldo's camp by pretending to surrender to the Filipinos.

Geography

Palanan is one of the four remote and isolated coastal towns of Isabela facing the Philippine Sea on the east and separated from the rest of the province by the Sierra Madre Mountains. It is also a suburb of Ilagan City, the provincial capital.

Barangays
Palanan is politically subdivided into 17 barangays. These barangays are headed by elected officials: Barangay Captain, Barangay Council, whose members are called Barangay Councilors. All are elected every three years.

 Alomanay
 Bisag
 Culasi
 Dialaoyao
 Dibewan
 Dicadyuan
 Dicotkotan
 Diddadungan
 Didyan
 Dimalicu-licu
 Dimasari
 Dimatican
 Ditambali
 Maligaya
 Marikit
 Centro East (Poblacion)
 Centro West (Poblacion)

Climate

Demographics

Economy

Government

Local government
The municipality is governed by a mayor designated as its local chief executive and by a municipal council as its legislative body in accordance with the Local Government Code. The mayor, vice mayor, and the councilors are elected directly by the people through an election which is being held every three years.

Elected officials

Congress representation
Palanan, belonging to the second legislative district of the province of Isabela, currently represented by Hon. Ed Christopher S. Go.

Education
The Schools Division of Isabela governs the town's public education system. The division office is a field office of the DepEd in Cagayan Valley region. The office governs the public and private elementary and public and private high schools throughout the municipality.

Infrastructure

The most common forms of transportation in Palanan are by horses, motorcycles, tricycles, or an improvised motorcycles called kuligligs. Due to its isolation, the town can be reached quickest by a 23-30 minute flight in a six-seater, single-engine Cyclone Air Cessna commuter plane from Cauayan. Palanan is served by Palanan Airport.

By water, a boat ride from the neighboring town of Divilacan or in the towns of Dingalan and Baler in Aurora province in the south usually takes about two to three hours and six to seven hours, respectively.

There are no roads that connect Palanan to the rest of province as the town can only be reached by a plane or boat ride, or a multi-day hike over the Sierra Madres from the neighboring town of San Mariano, which could take about three to five days. However, there is a construction of an 82-kilometer Ilagan-Divilacan Road through the protected Sierra Madre mountains is on-going to open access to the coastal towns of Divilacan, Palanan and Maconacon. The approved budget contract of the project amounting to P1.5B, will pass through the foothills of the 359,486-hectare Northern Sierra Madre mountain ranges. The project will improve an old logging road used by a defunct logging company until the 1990s. It will start in Barangay Sindon Bayabo in Ilagan City and will end in Barangay Dicatian in Divilacan. The project is started in March 2016 and is expected to be completed in 2024.

References

External links

Municipal Profile at the National Competitiveness Council of the Philippines
Palanan at the Isabela Government Website
Local Governance Performance Management System
[ Philippine Standard Geographic Code]
Philippine Census Information
Municipality of Palanan

Municipalities of Isabela (province)